Rabha Baptist Convention (RBC), previously known as “Rabha Baptist Church Union”, is a Baptist Christian denomination in India.  It is in the East of India, primarily in the state of Assam.  The Union is made up primarily of Rabha people, an indigenous ethnic group of northeastern India.  In 2017, the RBC has 12,356 members in 64 churches of Meghalaya, Assam and West Bengal, and eight fellowships.

History
In the period 1930–32, Christianity was introduced to the tribes and two young Rabhas accepted Christianity. The number of Christian families increased to around 20 families and a church established in Kalbhandari.
Two Rabhas, Kamakya and Ganesh Rabha, approached the Glasbys, Australian missionaries of the Australian Baptist Missionary Society, for help revitalising the church after many families had returned to Hinduism. The first Rabha Baptist Church was established at Kalbhandari on May 6, 1959. Rev Rex Glasby formulated the name “Rabha Baptist Church Union”, registering the RBCU under the society of Registration Act. 1960. The change of name to "Rabha Baptist Convention” occurred on February 14, 2014.

See also 

Council of Baptist Churches in Northeast India
List of Christian denominations in North East India
Boro Baptist Church Association
Boro Baptist Convention
Mising Baptist Kebang
Assam Baptist Convention
Garo Baptist Convention
Nagaland Baptist Church Council
Arunachal Baptist Church Council
Assam Baptist Convention

References

External links 

B. G. Carlsson Contested Belonging: An Indigenous People's Struggle for Forest and Identity in Sub-Himalayan Bengal

Baptist denominations in India